The 2001 French Figure Skating Championships took place between 13 and 17 December 2000 in Briançon. Skaters competed at the senior level in the disciplines of men's singles, women's singles, pair skating, and ice dancing. The event was used to help determine the French team to the 2001 World Championships and the 2001 European Championships.

Results

Men

Ladies

Pairs

Ice dancing

External links
 results

French Figure Skating Championships,2001
French Figure Skating Championships, 2001
French Figure Skating Championships
French Figure Skating Championships
French Figure Skating Championships